There are at least 33 named lakes and reservoirs in Randolph County, Arkansas.

Lakes
Brown Lake, el.  
Bull Pizzle Lake, el.  
Dishpan Lake, el.  
Gas Plant Lake, el.  
Horseshoe Lake, el.  
Legate Lake, el.  
Looney Lake, el.  
McGuire Lake, el.  
 Old River Island Lake, el.  
 Old River Slough, el.  
 Peachtree Lake, el.  
 Round Lake, el.  
 Schnabaum Lake, el.  
 Shakybog Lake, el.  
 Sparkman Lake, el.  
 Straight Lake, el.  
 Sumac Lake, el.  
 Wilson Lake, el.  
 Winebaugh Lake, el.

Reservoirs
Allison Lake, el.  
Baltz Lake, el.  
Bates Lake, el.  
Bibb Fish Pond, el.  
Blue Basin Lake, el.  
Fourche Creek Site 16 Reservoir, el.  
Fourche Creek Site 17 Reservoir, el.  
Fourche Creek Site 18 Reservoir, el.  
Kilo-Vista Lake, el.  
Lemmons Lake, el.  
Lost Lake, el.  
Meadows Lake, el.  
R J Barnett Lake, el.  
Wallace Lake, el.

See also
 List of lakes in Arkansas

Notes

Bodies of water of Randolph County, Arkansas
Randolph